The Edgar Dam is an earthfill embankment saddle dam without a spillway, located offstream in the South West region of Tasmania, Australia.

The impounded reservoir, also formed with the Scotts Peak Dam and the Serpentine Dam, is called Lake Pedder which flooded Lake Edgar, a naturally forming fault scarp pond. The dam was constructed in 1973 by the Hydro Electric Corporation (TAS) as part of the Gordon River Power Development Scheme for the purpose of generating hydro-electric power via the Gordon Power Station. Water from Lake Pedder is diverted to Lake Gordon (formed by the Gordon Dam) via the McPartlan Pass Canal.

Location and features
The Edgar Dam, together with the Scotts Peak Dam and the Serpentine Dam, are three major dams that form the headwaters for the Gordon River Power Development Scheme. The dam is located near Lake Pedder's most easterly point in the upper reaches of the Huon River where the river descends from the Marsden Range and descends into what is now known as the Huon Basin. Also at the southern end of the Lake Pedder, the Scotts Peak Dam impounds the Huon River. At the northwestern end of the lake is impounded by the Serpentine Dam across the Serpentine River. The water in Lake Pedder provides around 40% of the water used in the Gordon Power Station. The water flows to Lake Gordon via McPartlan Canal. Water from Lake Gordon then exits through the Gordon Dam.

At 100% capacity the dam wall holds back  of water. The dam wall does not have a spillway.

The dam draws its name from the flooded Lake Edgar.

Lake Edgar Fault
The scarp traverses the button grass of the Huon Plains and is notable because faulting resulted in the defeat of westerly flowing drainage and the consequent formation of the fault-bound sag pond of Lake Edgar. In spite of a tremor measuring 3.2 on the Richter magnitude scale in January 2001 near the Lake Edgar fault, which runs adjacent to the Edgar Dam, the ability of the dam to cope with stresses associated with seismic activity. .

Hydro Tasmania is confident that the eventuality of the Edgar Dam being destroyed by an earthquake is an extremely remote possibility.

See also

 List of dams in Tasmania

References

Further reading
 Reid, Vern (1976) Edgar Dam B&W photo between p. 248 and p249 (not indexed) of the Tasmanian Year Book No.10 1976. Australian Bureau of Statistics Tasmanian Office ISSN 0082-2116
 

Hydro Tasmania dams
Embankment dams
Dams completed in 1973
Infrastructure in Tasmania
Gordon River power development scheme